Šmarata is a village south of Stari Trg pri Ložu in the Municipality of Loška Dolina in the Inner Carniola region of Slovenia.

Name
Šmarata was attested in written records in 1275 as villa S. Margarite (and as circa sanctam Margareta in 1327, and Sand Margreten pey Sneperch in 1363). The name Šmarata is a contraction of *Š(ent)-Margareta 'Saint Margaret' (with development of Margareta > Marjeta), referring to the local church. In the local dialect, the village is known as Šmorata.

Church

The local church, from which the settlement gets its name, is dedicated to Saint Margaret and belongs to the Parish of Stari Trg.

References

External links

Šmarata on Geopedia

Populated places in the Municipality of Loška Dolina